Frédéric Verger (15 March 1959, Montreuil-sous-Bois) is a French writer.

Biography 
The holder of an agrégation ès letters since 1986, Frédéric Verger is currently a professor of French in the lycée d'Arsonval at Saint-Maur-des-Fossés.

He is also a chronicler for the Revue des deux Mondes.

In 2013, Frédéric Verger received the  prize, then in 2014 the prix Thyde Monnier de la Société des gens de lettres le prix Mémoire Albert Cohen, le Prix Goncourt du premier roman as well as the prix Valery-Larbaud for his novel , published by éditions Gallimard.

Work 
2013: Arden, series , éditions Gallimard,

References

External links 
 Arden on Babelio
 Prix Goncourt du premier roman 2014 : Arden, de Frédéric Verger  on Linternaute
 Arden by Frédéric Verger on Télérama (27 September 2013)
 His notice on the site of Gallimard

21st-century French novelists
Prix Goncourt du Premier Roman recipients
Prix Valery Larbaud winners
People from Montreuil, Seine-Saint-Denis
1959 births
Living people